Silpha is a genus of the family Silphidae, or carrion beetles, native to the Old World, with one species that is adventive in Canada.

Species
Silpha alpestris Kraatz, 1876
Silpha carinata Herbst, 1783
Silpha koreana Cho & Kwon, 1999
Silpha obscura Linnaeus, 1758
Silpha olivieri Bedel, 1887
Silpha perforata Gebler, 1832
Silpha puncticollis Lucas, 1846
Silpha tristis Illiger, 1798
Silpha tyrolensis Laicharting, 1781

References

Silphidae
Staphyliniformia genera
Taxa named by Carl Linnaeus